{{Taxobox
| name = Pasteurella lymphangitidis
| domain = Bacteria
| phylum = Pseudomonadota
| classis = Gammaproteobacteria
| ordo = Pasteurellales
| familia = Pasteurellaceae
| genus = Pasteurella| species = P. lymphangitidis| binomial = Pasteurella lymphangitidis| binomial_authority = Sneath and Stevens 1990
}}Pasteurella lymphangitidis is a bacterium; it causes bovine lymphangitis. Its reclassification to Yersinia has been proposed, given it poses a 99% sequence similarity to both Yersinia pseudotuberculosis and Yersinia pestis''.

References

Further reading

External links

LPSN
Type strain of Pasteurella lymphangitidis at BacDive -  the Bacterial Diversity Metadatabase

Pasteurellales
Bacteria described in 1990